Amphonyx rivularis is a moth of the  family Sphingidae. It is known from southern Brazil.

The wingspan is 110–150 mm, with males being much smaller than females.

Adults are on wing year round. They nectar at flowers.

The larvae feed on Guatteria diospyroides, Annona purpurea, Annona reticulata, Xylopia frutescens and Annona glabra and probably other Annonaceae species. They are very colourful.

References

Amphonyx
Moths described in 1875
Moths of South America